Leptodactylus colombiensis is a species of frog in the family Leptodactylidae. It is found in the foothills and lower slopes of the Andes in Colombia and westernmost Venezuela (Táchira).

Leptodactylus colombiensis is a common frog. It inhabits lowland and lower montane and montane humid forests. It can also be found in degraded habitats provided that there are puddles. It is a terrestrial and nocturnal species but one that is closely associated with waterbodies; it shelters on muddy holes near water.

References

Colombiensis
Amphibians of Colombia
Amphibians of Venezuela
Amphibians described in 1994
Taxonomy articles created by Polbot